The Palmer-Marsh House is a historic house museum and National Historic Landmark on Main Street south of Carteret Street in Bath, North Carolina.  Built in 1744, it is one of the oldest residences in North Carolina, and is a well-preserved example of a large colonial town house with a commercial space built in.  It was declared a National Historic Landmark in 1970.  It is now a North Carolina state historic site, and is open for tours.

Description and history
The Palmer-Marsh House is located in the center of Bath, on the east side of South Main Street just south of its junction with Carteret Street (North Carolina Highway 92).  It is a -story wood-frame structure, with a gabled roof, clapboard siding, and a brick-faced foundation.  It is oriented facing south, with a seven-bay facade that has a center entrance with minimal trim.  The other facades have secondary entrances at their centers.  The secondary entrance on the street-facing west side opens into a large chamber that extends the full depth of the house, with a parlor and study continuing across the front.  The interior retains some original features, including wide pine floors and exposed timber framing.

The house was built in 1744 by Michael Coutanch, who used the large western room as a shop.  In later years this space is also said to have played host to the colonial legislature when it met in Bath.  In the 1760s it was purchased by Robert Palmer, who served as the royal collector of the port, and was on the governor's council.  In 1802 the house was purchased by brothers Jonathan and Daniel Gould Marsh, whose family owned it until 1915.  It underwent restoration by Historic Bath in 1960–62, and was given to the state in 1963; it has served as a museum property ever since.

See also
List of the oldest buildings in North Carolina
List of National Historic Landmarks in North Carolina
National Register of Historic Places listings in Beaufort County, North Carolina

References

External links

Historic Bath: Palmer-Marsh House
 
 

Historic American Buildings Survey in North Carolina
National Historic Landmarks in North Carolina
Houses on the National Register of Historic Places in North Carolina
Houses in Beaufort County, North Carolina
Houses completed in 1744
Museums in Beaufort County, North Carolina
Historic house museums in North Carolina
National Register of Historic Places in Beaufort County, North Carolina
Historic district contributing properties in North Carolina
1744 establishments in the Thirteen Colonies